Texas Proposition 8 may refer to various ballot measures in Texas, including:

2007 Texas Proposition 8
2021 Texas Proposition 8